An Airplane, Single Engine, Land certificate (ASEL) is part of the Federal Aviation Administration (FAA) testing and certification standard: within a privilege level, it is a class rating as part of pilot certification in the United States. An ASEL identifies that the pilot in question holds a pilot license
for a fixed-wing aircraft that has a single engine and only lands on land—not a seaplane. ASEL is the most common license sought by private pilots; to specify that it is a Private Pilot License, it can be referred to as P/ASEL or PP-ASEL.

See also
Pilot certification in the United States

References 

Aviation in the United States
Aviation licenses and certifications